Marlon Felter (born 21 July 1978) is a Surinamese former footballer who played as a defender.

Career
Felter played club football for Inter Moengotapoe, FCS Nacional, and WBC.

He earned 44 caps for Suriname between 2004 and 2011, which included 19 appearances in FIFA World Cup qualifying matches.

References

1978 births
Living people
Surinamese footballers
Suriname international footballers
Inter Moengotapoe players
FCS Nacional players
S.V. Walking Boyz Company players
Association football defenders